The following are lists of best-selling video games by individual platform.

Platforms

Atari
List of best-selling Atari 2600 video games

Microsoft
List of best-selling Xbox video games
List of best-selling Xbox 360 video games
List of best-selling Xbox One video games

Nintendo
List of best-selling Nintendo Entertainment System video games
List of best-selling Game Boy video games
List of best-selling Super Nintendo Entertainment System video games
List of best-selling Nintendo 64 video games
List of best-selling Game Boy Advance video games
List of best-selling GameCube video games
List of best-selling Nintendo DS video games
List of best-selling Wii video games
List of best-selling Nintendo 3DS video games
List of best-selling Wii U video games
List of best-selling Nintendo Switch video games

Sega
List of best-selling Sega Genesis games

Sony
List of best-selling PlayStation video games
List of best-selling PlayStation 2 video games
List of best-selling PSP video games
List of best-selling PlayStation 3 video games
List of best-selling PlayStation 4 video games
List of best-selling PlayStation 5 video games

PC
List of best-selling PC games

Other 
List of highest-grossing arcade games

See also
List of best-selling video games
List of best-selling video game franchises
List of video games by player count

Platform
Best-selling
Best-selling